The cabinet of Thailand (formally, the Council of Ministers of Thailand; ;  is a body composed of thirty-five of the most senior members of the government of the Kingdom of Thailand. The cabinet is the primary organ of the executive branch of the Thai government. Members of the cabinet are nominated by the prime minister and formally appointed by the King of Thailand.  Most members are governmental department heads with the title of "minister of state" (.  The cabinet is chaired by the Prime Minister of Thailand. The cabinet is often collectively called "the government" or "the Royal Thai Government".

History

Prior to the Revolution of 1932, the absolutist Chakri kings ruled Siam through a series of "krom" ( and "senabodi" (. On 15 April 1874 King Chulalongkorn founded the King's Privy Council (which still exists today) made up of 49 senior princes and officials. For the first time the kings of Siam exercised his powers through a council.

On 14 July 1925 King Prajadhipok formed the Supreme Council of State of Siam made up of 5 senior princes (all of them his brothers and all of them ministers of state) to help govern the country. However, after the revolution in 1932, the Khana Ratsadon decided to dissolve this council. Instead the new constitution created a direct precursor of the cabinet called: the People's Committee of Siam (led by a president. The privy council from then on became a royal advisory council.

With the promulgation of  "permanent" constitution at the end of that year, the name of the committee was changed to the "council of ministers" and the name of the chair to prime minister, after King Prajadhipok deemed the old names too communistic. The first cabinet of Thailand was led by Phraya Manopakorn Nititada. All government departments and agencies were then immediately transferred to its control. To date there have been 58 cabinets of Thailand.

Ministers of State

Qualifications

According to the 2007 Constitution the cabinet is restricted to no more than 35 members. Members of the cabinet, unlike the prime minister, do not need to be a member of the House of Representatives, however most of them are. To be eligible to be a minister an individual must meet the following qualifications:

Be a Thai national by birth.
Be older than 35 years of age.
Have graduated with no less than a bachelor's degree or its equivalent.
Not be a member of the Senate (former senators must wait two years after their term of office to be eligible)

The individual must also: not be addicted to drugs, not have been bankrupt, not be a monk or a member of the clergy, not be disenfranchised, not be mentally infirm, not be under indictment or conviction, not have been expelled by a state agency for corruption or incompetence, not be a paid civil servant or member of the judiciary, and not ever been removed from any office by the Senate of Thailand.

Ministers of State are in theory appointed by the king, however in truth they are appointed at the advice of the prime minister to the king. Before taking office, a minister must make a solemn declaration before the king in the following words: 
"I, (name of the declarer), do solemnly declare that I will be loyal to the King and will faithfully perform my duties in the interests of the country and of the people. I will also uphold and observe the Constitution of the Kingdom of Thailand in every respect."

Roles
The 2007 Constitution of Thailand calls the cabinet the "Council of Ministers". The entire IXth chapter is dedicated to it. There are only 20 cabinet ministries, which means that 15 ministers are without portfolio. They can, however, be appointed deputy prime ministers or deputy ministers. According to the constitution, the cabinet must, within fifteen days of being sworn in, state its policies to the National Assembly of Thailand. Ministers have the right to go in person to the national assembly to state and explain policies or opinions.

Each minister is responsible for his actions and the actions of his department and is therefore accountable to the national assembly. Therefore, the assembly can compel the minister to appear before it and explain his actions. The House of Representatives and the Senate can forcefully remove a sitting minister by a vote of no confidence. A one-sixth of the chamber vote is needed to call a debate and a simple majority is required for removal. A minister can also be removed by the king on the advice of the prime minister.

The Cabinet

Function
As the primary government institution in the executive branch, the cabinet is ultimately responsible for the administration and management of various government agencies and departments. It is also the primary institution for the formulation of policies with regards to all areas of politics and governing. Legislatively the cabinet is one of the institutions allowed to submit bills to the National Assembly for consideration. The cabinet is also allowed to call a joint sitting of the National Assembly to consider important bills or even join a joint sitting of the Assembly. The cabinet is also allowed to call a national referendum.

The cabinet is governed by the rule of collective responsibility, in which the members of the cabinet must support all policies despite personal or private disagreement. As a result, if the government fails or if the policies of the government fails then the entire cabinet must take responsibility; and resign in its entirety. The cabinet's term is wedded to that of the Prime Minister. The Leader of the Opposition is allowed to create his own cabinet or the Shadow Cabinet of Thailand.

Cabinet of Thailand 2021
On 10 July 2019, King Maha Vajiralongkorn issued a royal command to appoint a 36-member cabinet with Gen Prayut Chan-o-cha as prime minister and defence minister. The cabinet was sworn in by the king on 16 July 2019. On 23 March 2021, the cabinet was reshuffled. , the members of the cabinet of Thailand were as follows:

See also
Prime Minister of Thailand
King of Thailand
List of ministries of Thailand
List of female cabinet ministers of Thailand
Constitutional organizations of Thailand
Shadow Cabinet of Thailand

References

External links
 2007 Constitution of the Kingdom of Thailand s:2007 Constitution of Thailand
Official Webpage
Thai Government - Cabinet Announcement
BBC - Thai post-coup cabinet sworn in (2006)

Politics of Thailand
Government of Thailand
Thailand